Senior Skip Day is a long-standing tradition in most American and Canadian high schools and junior high school where the senior class will excuse themselves from school on a pre-determined day.

Senior Skip Day may also refer to:
"Skip Day" (The Cleveland Show), an episode of The Cleveland Show
"Senior Skip Day", a song by American rapper Mac Miller from the 2010 album K.I.D.S.